The 2021 Mercer Bears football team represented Mercer University in the 2021 NCAA Division I FCS football season as a member of the Southern Conference (SoCon). The Bears were led by second-year head coach Drew Cronic and played their home games at Moye Complex in Macon, Georgia.

Schedule

Roster

References

Mercer
Mercer Bears football seasons
Mercer Bears football